, also written as (303775) 2005 QU182, is a trans-Neptunian object with a bright absolute magnitude of ca. 3.6.

Distance
It came to perihelion in 1971 and is currently 51.8 AU from the Sun. In April 2013, it moved beyond 50 AU from the Sun.

It has been observed 81 times over 10 oppositions with precovery images back to 1974.

See also
List of Solar System objects most distant from the Sun

References

External links 
 

303775
Discoveries by Michael E. Brown
Discoveries by Chad Trujillo
Discoveries by David L. Rabinowitz
303775
303775
20050830